Cocchi is a surname of Italian origin. People with that name include:

 Antonio Cocchi (1695-1758), Italian physician, naturalist and writer
 Benito Cocchi (1934-2016), Roman Catholic archbishop
 Francesco Cocchi (1788-1865), Italian painter and scenic designer
 Ginepro Cocchi (born Antonio Cocchi, 1908-1939), Italian Roman Catholic priest
 Gioacchino Cocchi ( – 1804), Italian composer
 Pompeo Cocchi, Italian painter
 Riccardo Cocchi (born 1977), eight-time Latin Dance Champion

See also
 Cocchi Americano, a quinine-laced aperitif wine produced by Giulio Cocchi Spumanti
 Cocci, plural of coccus, any bacterium or archaeon that has a spherical, ovoid, or generally round shape
 Giulio Cocchi Spumanti, an Italian winery
 Obelisks of the Corsa dei Cocchi, two marble monuments located in Florence, Italy
 Palazzo Cocchi-Serristori, a Renaissance-style palace in Florence, Italy
 

Surnames of Italian origin